Palakeedu mandal is one of the 23 mandals in Suryapet district of the Indian state of Telangana. It is under the administration of Suryapet revenue division with its headquarters at Palakeedu.It is bounded by Neredcherla mandal towards north, Mattampally mandal towards east, Nalgonda district towards west and Krishna river towards south.

Demographics
Palakeedu mandal has a population about 24,356.

Villages 
It is carved out from Neredcherla mandal. The mandal has 14 settlements. The settlements in the mandal are listed below:

Notes
(†) Mandal headquarter

References

Mandals in Suryapet district